GRP may refer to:

Biochemistry
 Gastrin-releasing peptide
 Grp78, Grp94, Grp170, glucose-regulated proteins 
 Grape reaction product

Mathematics
 Grp, the Category of groups

Technology and materials
 Glass-reinforced-plastic, also known as Fiberglass, or Fibreglass.
 Gentoo Reference Platform

Transport
 Grove Park railway station, London, National Rail station code

Other uses
 Government resource planning
 US Grasslands Reserve Program
 Gross rating point 
 Gross regional product
 GRP Records, an American jazz label
 Gurupi Airport, in Brazil